Leavenworth High School is a public high school located in Leavenworth, Kansas, operated by Leavenworth USD 453 school district. The school was established in 1865, making it one of the first high schools in Kansas. The school colors are blue and white and the mascot is the "Pioneer". Leavenworth High School offers many extracurricular activities, both athletic and non-athletic.

History
The school was established in 1865, making it one of the first high schools in the state of Kansas. Students studied Latin, math, rhetoric, science, Caesar and Virgil like their counterparts from the East Coast.

Extracurricular activities

Athletics
The Pioneers compete in the United Kansas Conference and are classified as a 5A school, the second largest classification in Kansas, according to the Kansas State High School Activities Association. Throughout its history, Leavenworth has won several state championships in various sports.

State championships

Notable alumni
 Pat Baldwin, assistant coach for the Georgetown Hoyas, former head coach for the Milwaukee Panthers
 Mary Byrd, pioneer astronomy professor and astronomer
 Sharice Davids, United States House Representative for Kansas's 3rd congressional district
 Murry Dickson, former Major League Baseball pitcher 
 Melissa Etheridge, musician
 Gary Foster, American instrumentalist
 Amy Hastings, distance runner, NCAA champion, Olympian, 2017 World Championships marathon medalist
 Linda Powell, actress
 Norman Ramsey, awarded the 1989 Nobel Prize in Physics
 Robert A. Rosenberg, U.S. Air Force major general
 Wayne Simien, former All-American basketball player for the Kansas Jayhawks and NBA champion with the Miami Heat
 Edwin Slosson, editor, author and chemist
 Theresa Vail, 2013 Miss Kansas
 J. White Did It, record producer, songwriter, and DJ
 Richard Sanders, Actor, WKRP in Cincinnati

See also

 List of high schools in Kansas
 List of unified school districts in Kansas

References

External links
 
 Leavenworth City Map, KDOT

Public high schools in Kansas
Schools in Leavenworth County, Kansas
Educational institutions established in 1865
1865 establishments in Kansas
Buildings and structures in Leavenworth, Kansas